PNC Plaza is a skyscraper in Downtown, Louisville, Kentucky and located at 500 West Jefferson Street. A notable feature of the building is the pattern of pre-cast concrete panels on the exterior of its windows. The building, originally named Citizens Fidelity Plaza, was named after Citizens Fidelity Bank and renamed PNC Plaza when Citizens Fidelity was acquired by PNC Bank.

PNC Plaza became the tallest building in the state of Kentucky in 1971, but lost that distinction a year later when National City Tower was completed in 1972. PNC now has offices in both buildings due to its own acquisition of National City Corp. in an unrelated move, however, it does not own National City Tower.

The Jefferson Club, a private city club, was located on the top floor of the building, until closing in February 2010.

The building was purchased by Optima International, run by Chaim Schochet, of Miami for a $77 million cash and mortgage assumption deal that closed on September 21, 2011.

In 2019, Milwaukee-based financial services firm Baird purchased Louisville financial services firm Hilliard Lyons and became the anchor tenant, renovating and moving workers to the top five floors.

In August 2020, Federal prosecutors filed a lawsuit claiming that the Ukrainian owners were laundering billions of dollars over more than ten years.

In November 2020, SomeraRoad bought the tower for $22.5 million, renamed it to "500 West Jefferson," and began renovation plans.  Vice President of SomeraRoad Andrew Marchetti hopes to attract new tenants with these amenities and updates.  Spending $16 million, changes include a new entrance and lobby, a tenant lounge, a conference center, and fitness center.  Ev's Deli is currently the only café or restaurant in the building.   In September 2022, Tennessee-based Barista Parlor announced it was opening a new location in 500 W.

See also
RBC Plaza, which has recently been renamed 'PNC Plaza'

References

External links 
 500 W Louisville

Skyscraper office buildings in Louisville, Kentucky
Office buildings completed in 1971
Modernist architecture in Kentucky
Welton Becket buildings